Harald Rittersbacher (born 27 April 1963) is a former professional tennis player from Germany.

Biography
Born in Ludwigshafen, Rittersbacher played collegiate tennis in the United States for Texas Christian University in the early 1980s.

Rittersbacher, a right-handed player, made his grand slam main draw debut at the 1986 French Open in the men's doubles with Anthony Emerson. At the 1987 Wimbledon Championships he and partner Russell Barlow faced top seeds Guy Forget and Yannick Noah for a first round loss. He made his third and final grand slam appearance in the mixed doubles with Marise Kruger at the 1988 French Open.

On the Grand Prix circuit he made most of his appearances in doubles, making several quarter-finals.

He won his only Challenger title in 1989, which came in the doubles at Montabaur in his home country.

Now a tennis coach, Rittersbacher was formerly based in Mannheim, the birthplace of Steffi Graf, who had him as a hitting partner for several years. He was later an assistant coach for the tennis team at Hawaii Pacific University.

Challenger titles

Doubles: (1)

References

External links
 
 

1963 births
Living people
German male tennis players
West German male tennis players
Sportspeople from Ludwigshafen
TCU Horned Frogs men's tennis players